Masties (reigned  426–494 or 449–516) was the ruler of Kingdom of the Aurès, a Roman-Berber kingdom in Algeria.

Biography 
During the fall of the Western Roman Empire in the second half of the 5th century, several Roman-Berber kingdoms (including that of Altava) were formed in the mountainous areas of the provinces that were not controlled by the Vandal Kingdom. Since the deposition of Romulus Augustulus by Odoacer in 476, and the assassination of the last legitimate Western emperor, Julius Nepos in 480, these kingdoms had become vassal states of the Eastern Roman Empire.

Masties established his territory in Numidia with Arris as his residence. In order to legitimize his reign with the Roman Provincials, he accepted the title of Imperator and declared himself openly as a Christian after 476, as part of a rebellion against the Vandal king Huneric.

According to an inscription found at Arris, Masties reigned for 67 years as a dux, and 40 years (or only 10 years) of them as an Emperor of "Romans and Moors" until 516 AD, where he knew how to practice a skillful policy to balance between the Byzantines and the Moors. There is no indication that the "empire" of Masties was recognized by Constantinople, in which the Berber princes were considered as "usurpers".

He was later succeeded by Iaudas.

Historical sources 
Funeral inscription found in the Aurès mountains at Arris (L'Année Épigraphique 1945: 97, ECDS entry, EDH entry HD019959)

References

Bibliography 

Michael Maas: The Cambridge Companion to the Age of Attila. Cambridge University Press, 2014, pp. 277-278
 
Philip Rosseau (ed.): A Companion to Late Antiquity. Wiley, 2012, p. 579
 .
 Jehan Desanges: À propos de Masties, imperator berbère et chrétien. In: Ktema 21, 1996, pp. 183–188.
 Paul-Albert Février: Masuna et Masties.  In: Antiquités africaines 24, 1988, pp. 133–147 (online copy).
 Pierre Morizot: Pour une nouvelle lecture de l'Elogium de Masties. In: Antiquités africaines 25, 1989, pp. 263–284.
 Pierre Morizot: Masties a-t-il été imperator? In: Zeitschrift für Papyrologie und Epigraphik 141, 2002, pp. 231–240 (JSTOR)
 

5th-century Berber people
5th-century monarchs in Africa
5th-century Romans
Berber rulers